Augusto Cassiano Neves de Mascarenhas de Andrade Barreto (27 January 1923 – 3 January 2017) was a Portuguese fencer. He competed in the team sabre event at the 1952 Summer Olympics.

References

External links
 

1923 births
2017 deaths
Fencers at the 1952 Summer Olympics
Olympic fencers of Portugal
Portuguese male sabre fencers
Sportspeople from Lisbon